Club Deportivo Cultural Areas is a Spanish football club based in the parish of Areas, Ponteareas, Galicia. Founded in 1967, the team plays in Tercera División – Group 1. The club's home ground is Estadio A Lomba, which has a capacity of 1,000 spectators.

They currently play in Tercera División – Group 1, the fourth tier of Spanish football.

Season to season

6 seasons in Tercera División

References

External links
Futbolme.com profile 

Football clubs in Galicia (Spain)
Association football clubs established in 1967
1967 establishments in Spain